Bad Company are an English hard rock band from London. Formed in 1973, the group originally featured vocalist and rhythm guitarist Paul Rodgers, lead guitarist Mick Ralphs, bassist Boz Burrell and drummer / percussionist Simon Kirke. The band's current lineup features constant member Kirke, Rodgers (absent between 1986 and 1998), guitarist Howard Leese (joined 2008), and bassist Todd Ronning (joined 2012).

History

1973–1999
Bad Company were formed in late 1973 by former Free vocalist Paul Rodgers and drummer Simon Kirke, alongside former Mott the Hoople guitarist Mick Ralphs and former King Crimson bassist Raymond "Boz" Burrell. The band were active with their initial lineup until 1982, during which time they released six studio albums that brought them critical and commercial success. After recording sessions for Rough Diamonds led to arguments and confrontations between band members, particularly Rodgers and Burrell, the vocalist left Bad Company and the group disbanded.

In 1986, Ralphs and Kirke began working together on a new project with former Ted Nugent band vocalist Brian Howe. The group was later branded Bad Company at the request of their label Atlantic Records, with Steve Price performing on Fame and Fortune before Burrell returned for the European tour. Gregg Dechert was also added to the touring lineup on keyboards and rhythm guitar.  Burrell left after the European tour, with Price returning for the American tour.  Price played bass on the album 'Dangerous Age' and completed the American tour before leaving the band in 1990. in 1988, Dechert was replaced on tour by Larry Oakes. Paul Cullen joined on bass after the release of Holy Water in 1990, while Dave "Bucket" Colwell joined on second guitar. Geoff Whitehorn substituted for Ralphs during the tour.

Colwell remained part of the touring lineup in 1992 alongside new bassist Rick Wills, with both featured on the live release What You Hear Is What You Get. In the summer of 1994, Howe left Bad Company and was replaced by Robert Hart. The group released Company of Strangers the following year, on which Colwell and Wills were credited as full band members. In late 1998, Rodgers and Burrell returned for a reunion of the original lineup of Bad Company, recording four new tracks and touring throughout 1999. After the tour, the group disbanded again.

Since 2001
A third reformation of Bad Company took place in the spring of 2001, with Rodgers and Kirke joined by Colwell and Wills. Jaz Lochrie replaced Wills in 2002. In 2008, Ralphs joined the pair for a one-off show at Hard Rock Live. Rhythm guitarist Howard Leese and bassist Lynn Sorensen, both members of Rodgers's solo band, completed the lineup. The same lineup returned for a North American tour the following year, followed by UK and US shows in 2010. Another member of the vocalist's touring band, Todd Ronning, replaced Sorensen in 2012.

For a US tour in mid-2016, Rich Robinson of The Black Crowes substituted for Ralphs, who was "not feeling up for" the shows. He later returned, but was forced to leave later in the year after suffering a stroke.

Members

Current

Former

Touring

Timeline

Lineups

References

External links
Bad Company official website

Bad Company